Royal Air Force Troödos, commonly known as RAF Troödos, is a Royal Air Force station in the Republic of Cyprus.

RAF Troödos is a remote Signals Station run by 27 personnel from Golf Section, Joint Service Signal Unit (Cyprus), and also contains Mount Olympus Radar Station.

History
Troödos Station is the oldest remaining British military base in Cyprus, dating from 1878. Initially it was used as a cool summer field hospital for troops from the Egyptian Campaign. British Army and Government officials also used it as a summer retreat.

Current use
Declassified documents show that RAF Troödos intercepted satellite communications for the Government Communications Headquarters (GCHQ), and documents released by Edward Snowden suggest this has continued in recent years funded by the U.S. National Security Agency. Information from Snowden also indicates the site acts as a listening post for radio signals from the near Middle East.

The British National Space Centre Starbrook wide-field telescope has been here since 2006.

See also

 Ayios Nikolaos Station
 List of Royal Air Force stations

References

External links

Royal Air Force stations in Cyprus
UKUSA listening stations